Close to Leo is a 2002 French TV film directed by Christophe Honoré. It is also known as Everything Against Leo.

Plot 
Leo (Pierre Mignard), is the eldest of four brothers. Marcel (Yannis Lespert), age 10, is the youngest. With their young parents, they are a happy and close-knit family. One evening, Marcel overhears his family discussing the news that Leo is HIV-positive. They all agree to protect Marcel from the news, even though Leo wants to tell his little brother, not only that he has HIV, but that he is gay.

The family continues pretending everything is fine to Marcel, but the young boy is devastated and starts behaving badly. Marcel wants the truth, but neither his parents nor his brothers can bring themselves to speak openly about it. Marcel is just on the edge of puberty and is sometimes childish and sometimes mature and sensitive.  When he is excluded from a midnight ocean swim by his brothers, he follows them to the beach demanding to be included.

Leo takes Marcel off to Paris so that he can visit an old boyfriend and explain both himself and his situation to his young brother.

Marcel understands that Leo is very unhappy with his situation, and sees him  decide to stop taking his medication. Leo cannot cope with the stress and puts Marcel on a train back home to Brittany, asking the boy to lighten the atmosphere back home.

Cast 
 Yaniss Lespert as Marcel
 Pierre Mignard as Léo
 Marie Bunel as Mother
 Dominic Gould as Father
 Rodolphe Pauly as Tristan
 Jérémie Lippmann as Pierrot
 Louis Gonzales as Yvan
 Joana Preiss as Yvan's mother
 Assaad Bouab as Aymeric

References

External links 
 

2002 television films
2002 films
Films directed by Christophe Honoré
French LGBT-related films
Gay-related films
2000s French films